Heybeli can refer to:

 Heybeli, Adilcevaz
 Heybeli, Erzincan
 Heybeli, Sason
 Heybeliada, an island in the Sea of Marmara near Istanbul